Slobodan "Bobby" Despotovski (born 14 July 1971) is an Australian soccer player who played 12 seasons in the top tier of Australian soccer. He played in National Soccer League (NSL) for Heidelberg United and Morwell Falcons before moving to Perth Glory where he played eight seasons in the NSL and two in the A-League.

Early life
Despotovski was born in Perth, Western Australia, to a Macedonian father, Cvetko, and mother, Valentina (Saharov). Her maternal parents, Martin and Margareta Saharov were from Sevastopol, Crimea, USSR. Valentina was born in Kačarevo, Pančevo and married Cvetko in Vojvodina.

Only nine months after his birth his family moved to Yugoslavia because his mother was homesick. He grew up with his family in the town of Pančevo, 16 km outside the capital Belgrade, and played junior level football with Red Star Belgrade.

When Despotovski was 15 he had a choice to continue either handball which he says had always played a large part in his life, or to pursue a career in professional football, eventually he chose football and was selected to play for the reserve team at his first senior club, Dinamo Pančevo.

Playing career
After a stint with the Yugoslav People's Army during the Yugoslav wars which ended as a result of self-inflicted injuries, Despotovski returned to his birthplace in 1992 and continued his professional career with Floreat Athena in the Western Australian Premier League. In 1994, he joined Heidelberg in the NSL and left the club to join the now defunct NSL club Morwell Falcons in 1995.

Bobby's career took off when he received a call from the then Perth Glory general manager, Roger Lefort. The new club wanted Despotovski to lead their attack in the club's inaugural season and he certainly didn't disappoint scoring 14 goals in only 23 NSL games.

Despotovski was in the centre of a controversy when playing against the Melbourne Knights (a team primarily supported by Croatian Australians) at the Knights Stadium on 21 May 2001 he gave a three fingered salute to the predominantly Croatian crowd which is a Serbian Orthodox symbol that represents Orthodox Christianity. As the Perth team left the stadium Despotovski and Perth coach Bernd Stange were assaulted by angry Knights supporters. To avoid repetition of violence, the next Knights home fixture against Perth was played in Launceston.

He was one of the most successful strikers in the now defunct Australian National Soccer League. Despotovski was with the Western Australian team Perth Glory for 10 years, and holds their all-time goal scoring record.

Following the conclusion of the 2004/2005 season of the NSL Despotovski signed with Perth Glory for the 2005/2006 A-League season after a brief stint with the Bonnyrigg White Eagles in the Vodafone Premier League in NSW. Despotovski finished the season as joint top goal scorer of the league and winner of the Johnny Warren Medal. Season 2006/2007 started without Bobby because of his re-occurring back injury but he returned to partner Stuart Young up front.

Coaching career
He was the coach of Inglewood United in 2007, and the coach of Perth boys school Hale School's 1st XI Soccer side in 2008.

He was variously the coach of the Perth Glory NPL U20s team and the Perth Glory's Women's team between 2015 and 2020.

Career statistics

International

Honours 
Perth Glory
 NSL Championship: 2002–03, 2003–04

Individual
 Johnny Warren Medal: 2005–06 with Perth Glory
 A-League Golden Boot: 2005–06 with Perth Glory – 8 goals
 Perth Glory Most Glorious Player Award: 2005–06, 2003–04, 2001–02, 2000–01
 Perth Glory Player's Player of the Year: 2005–06
 Perth Glory Member's Player of the Year: 2002–03
 W-League Coach of the Year: 2016–17

References

External links
 Oz Football profile

1971 births
Living people
A-League Men players
National Soccer League (Australia) players
Sportsmen from Western Australia
Australian people of Serbian descent
Australian soccer players
Australia international soccer players
Red Star Belgrade footballers
FK Dinamo Pančevo players
Expatriate footballers in Yugoslavia
Perth Glory FC players
Bonnyrigg White Eagles FC players
Floreat Athena FC players
Soccer players from Perth, Western Australia
Association football forwards
Gippsland Falcons players
Australian people of Macedonian descent
2002 OFC Nations Cup players